South Carolina Highway 92 (SC 92) is a  state highway in the U.S. state of South Carolina. The highway connects Gray Court with the Enoree area.

Route description
SC 92 begins at an intersection with SC 101 (East Mill Street) in Gray Court within Laurens County. It travels to the northeast and crosses over but does not have an interchange with Interstate 385 (I-385). The highway travels through rural areas of the county and has an intersection with U.S. Route 221 (US 221). The two highways travel concurrently to the north-northeast. They cross over the Enoree River, enter Spartanburg County, and enter Enoree, where SC 92 splits off to the east. A short distance later is an interchange with I-26. It immediately curves to the south-southeast and parallels I-26 until just before meeting its eastern terminus, an intersection with SC 49 (Union Highway).

Major intersections

Enoree connector route

South Carolina Highway 92 Connector (SC 92 Conn.) is a  connector route that connects SC 92 with U.S. Route 221 (US 221) northbound in the southern part of Enoree. It is a northbound-only street.

See also

References

External links

SC 92 South Carolina Hwy Index

092
Transportation in Laurens County, South Carolina
Transportation in Spartanburg County, South Carolina